Capite censi were literally, in Latin, "those counted by head" in the ancient Roman census. Also known as "the head count", the term was used to refer to the lowest class of citizens, people not of the nobility or middle classes, owning little or no property; thus they were counted by the head rather than by their property. Initially capite censi was synonymous with proletarii, meaning those citizens whose property was too small to be rated for the census. Later, though, the proletarii were distinguished from the capite censi as having "appreciable property" to the value of 11,000 asses or less. In contrast, the capite censi are assumed to have not owned any property of significance.

Gaius Marius, as part of the Marian reforms of 107 BC, allowed these non-land-owning Romans to enlist in the Roman legions. For the first time, men no longer had to own property to fight for Rome. Because these men had no property, they became the clients of their generals, and veterans looked to them for land or monies after demobilization. Since the reforms did not include a permanent demobilization method divorced from army commanders, soldiers became closely linked to their generals for the process of rewarding them for service on demobilization (retirement from active service).  The lack of a permanent demobilization process run by the government in Marius' military reform would help facilitate the demise of the Roman Republic.

See also

Notes

Social classes in ancient Rome